George Bragg Fielder (July 24, 1842 – August 14, 1906) was an American Civil War veteran, banker, and politician who represented New Jersey's 7th congressional district in the United States House of Representatives for one term from 1893–1895.

His son, James Fairman Fielder, became the 35th Governor of New Jersey.

Biography
Born in Jersey City, New Jersey in 1842, he engaged in banking and with his father built the New Jersey Southern and New York, New Hampshire and Willimantic Railroads. In 1862, at the outbreak of the American Civil War, he joined the Union Army as a private, and rose to the rank of lieutenant while serving throughout the war.

Political career
He entered politics and was elected Register of Hudson County, New Jersey for two terms from 1884 until 1893.

A Democrat, he won a seat in the United States House of Representatives in the 53rd United States Congress, representing the 7th District for a single term from March 4, 1893 to March 3, 1895.

Later life
After his term was over, he declined to run again. He was elected to a third term as Register of Hudson County in 1895.

He died in 1906 in Windham, New York and is buried in Bayview – New York Bay Cemetery in Jersey City.

He did not live to see his son, James, serve as governor of New Jersey from 1913 to 1917.

References
 Retrieved on 2008-02-14

External links
George Bragg Fielder entry at The Political Graveyard

1842 births
1906 deaths
Burials at Bayview – New York Bay Cemetery
Politicians from Jersey City, New Jersey
Democratic Party members of the United States House of Representatives from New Jersey
Union Army officers
19th-century American politicians
Military personnel from New Jersey